Sound of Freedom is an unreleased American biographical action drama film directed by Alejandro Monteverde. It stars Jim Caviezel, Mira Sorvino, and Bill Camp. Caviezel plays Tim Ballard, a self-styled anti-human trafficking activist and founder of the organization Operation Underground Railroad.

Plot
Sound of Freedom tells the story of Tim Ballard, a former operative, who quits his job as a Special  Agent with Homeland Security Investigations (HSI) to save children from cartels and human traffickers. It takes a look into the child trafficking in Latin American countries, especially Mexico. Ballard calls himself a modern day abolitionist and in addition to saving these children he wants to get rid of the problem at the root. He says that America is the biggest consumer of this evil. The story will show how Ballard went to Colombia to rescue 127 children from sexual abuse and misery.

Accuracy
Investigative journalists Lynn Packer and Damion Moore of American Crime Journal reported that Tim Ballard lied about his involvement in the case and fabricated details about his child sex trafficking activities. The film begins with the arrest of Earl Venton Buchanan, which is the case that Tim Ballard claims was "confirmation from God" for him to begin his own child sex trafficking rescue organization Operation Underground Railroad. In the film, Tim Ballard rescues a kidnapped Mexican child from human trafficker Earl Buchanan at the border crossing in Calexico, California. The then five year-old child runs to Ballard and hands him a necklace, that was given to him by his sister before they were separated by sex traffickers. The necklace has a verse from the first book of Timothy. Ballard then quits the Department of Homeland Security to rescue the sister of the trafficked boy from a reputed Columbian drug lord. Ballard finds the boy's sister and kills the drug lord while posing as a doctor.

Cast 
 Jim Caviezel as Tim Ballard
 Mira Sorvino as Katherine Ballard
 Bill Camp as Batman
 Kurt Fuller as Frost
 Gary Basaraba as Earl Buchanan
 José Zúñiga as Roberto
 Gerardo Taracena as El Alacrán
 Scott Haze as Chris
 Eduardo Verástegui as Paul
Javier Godino as Jorge
Gustavo Sánchez Parra as El Calacas

Production

Pre-production
Jim Caviezel, before the shooting of the film, spent several days shadowing Tim Ballard and learning about Operation Underground Railroad's operations. He says that he was able to go to Latin America and witness an operation led by Ballard himself.

The film is scored by the Spanish composer Javier Navarrete.

Filming
Principal photography began in the summer of 2018. While some of Sound of Freedom was shot in the United States (Calexico, California), most of the film was shot in Cartagena, Colombia.

Release
Currently, the film does not have a release date. Various dates were announced for the film's premiere, but each passed without a release taking place.

Jim Caviezel has stated that this was the second most important film he has ever done. He ranks it behind his role as Jesus Christ in 2004's The Passion of the Christ. Tim Ballard personally requested that Jim Caviezel portray him in the film; the producers were taken aback by the request and tried to convince him to select an actor who more closely resembled him. However, Ballard was steadfast, saying that he was affected by Caviezel's roles in The Passion of the Christ and The Count of Monte Cristo.

References

External links

 on The Numbers

Upcoming films
Films shot in Colombia
Films shot in California
American biographical drama films
American action drama films
Upcoming English-language films
Spanish-language American films
Films about human trafficking
Films scored by Javier Navarrete